The Nio EC7 is a battery-powered mid-size luxury crossover SUV manufactured by Chinese electric car company Nio. It was announced on the Nio Day in late 2022 and first deliveries are scheduled for June 2023. The EC7 serves as the flagship coupe SUV.

Overview 

The EC7 is a 5-door, 5-seater crossover SUV with a sporting roofline. It is a "crossover coupe" counterpart to the more boxy ES7. The car is offered with an option for a 150-kWh battery, available for all current Nio models. The EC7 is powered by a lithium-ion battery pack, which is swappable, just like the Nio ES8. The EC7 acts as a direct competitor to the Tesla Model X.

Specifications 
The EC7 generates , translating into a 0–100 km/h time of 3.8 seconds. This version uses a 300 kW induction motor in the rear and a 180 kW permanent magnet motor in the front.
The EC7 is available with  three lithium-ion battery pack options: 75 kWh, 100 kWh, and 150 kWh, officially expected to deliver a CLTC range of up to 490 km (305 miles), up to 635 km (395 miles), and 940 km (584 miles), respectively. 

Nio claims that the EC7 has a drag coefficient of 0.23, which is the lowest ever for a production SUV as of 2023. The car features active air suspension, NOMI AI personal assistant, Nappa leather and intelligent fragrance system.

References 

EC7
Electric concept cars
Luxury crossover sport utility vehicles
Production electric cars
Cars introduced in 2022